The Beaver Rocks are a group of rocks lying  off Belitsa Peninsula at a point midway between Notter Point and Cape Kjellman, Trinity Peninsula. They were named by the UK Antarctic Place-Names Committee after the de Havilland Beaver, a type of aircraft used by the British Antarctic Survey.

References 

Rock formations of the Trinity Peninsula